Ricardo Guasch de la Heras (10 November 1933 – 22 September 2010) was a Mexican equestrian. He competed at the 1964 Summer Olympics and the 1968 Summer Olympics.

References

External links
 

1933 births
2010 deaths
Mexican male equestrians
Olympic equestrians of Mexico
Equestrians at the 1964 Summer Olympics
Equestrians at the 1968 Summer Olympics
Pan American Games medalists in equestrian
Pan American Games bronze medalists for Mexico
Equestrians at the 1979 Pan American Games
Sportspeople from Mexico City
Medalists at the 1979 Pan American Games
20th-century Mexican people